The 2016 Wisconsin Badgers football team represented the University of Wisconsin–Madison in the 2016 NCAA Division I FBS football season. The Badgers, led by second-year head coach Paul Chryst, were members of the West Division of the Big Ten Conference and played their home games at Camp Randall Stadium in Madison, Wisconsin.

Offseason

Players lost 
Michael Caputo
Alex Erickson
Tyler Marz
Joe Schobert
Austin Traylor
Derek Watt

Watchlists and preseason awards
 Michael Deiter (C)
 Rimington Trophy

 Jack Cichy (OLB)
 Lott IMPACT Trophy

 Corey Clement (RB)
 Maxwell Award, Doak Walker Award

 Vince Biegel (OLB)
 Bednarik Award, Nagurski Award, Butkus Award, Allstate AFCA Good Works Team

 Dan Voltz (G)
 Outland Trophy

Schedule
Wisconsin announced its 2016 football schedule on July 11, 2013. The 2016 schedule consists of 6 home, 5 away, and 1 neutral site game in the regular season. The Badgers will host Big Ten foes Illinois, Minnesota, Nebraska, and Ohio State, and will travel to Iowa, Michigan, Michigan State, Northwestern, and Purdue.

The team's three non–conference games are against the Akron Zips from the Mid-American Conference (MAC), Georgia State Panthers from the Sun Belt Conference, and the LSU Tigers from the Southeastern Conference (SEC).

The Associated Press and Coaches' preseason top 25 polls were released in August and for the first time since 2009 the Badgers were unranked in both polls. Meanwhile, the first five of their Power 5 opponents were all ranked 17th or higher in the preseason polls with #5 LSU, #6 Ohio State, #7 Michigan, #12 Michigan State and #17 Iowa.

Schedule Source:

Rankings

Game summaries

vs. LSU 

The Badgers started off the regular season with a neutral site game against the LSU Tigers at Lambeau Field in Green Bay, Wisconsin. LSU was favored to win the game by double digits. The Badgers came out to lead 6–0 by halftime with the Badgers kicker, Rafael Gaglianone, making two field goals; one from 30 and the other 48 yards. Running back Corey Clement led the Badgers on their opening drive of the third quarter and scored a touchdown on a five-yard run. LSU responded with two touchdowns shortly thereafter due to a quick succession of Badgers' turnovers. Another field goal in the fourth quarter from 47 yards put the Badgers back in the lead. In the last minute of the game, and within field goal range, LSU quarterback Brandon Harris was nearly sacked by linebacker Vince Biegel and threw an interception which was caught by Safety D'Cota Dixon; LSU offensive lineman Josh Boutte was subsequently ejected for a flagrant hit after the play. The turnover secured the victory for the Badgers who in turn ran out the clock.

The game was fifth-year senior Bart Houston's debut as Wisconsin's starting quarterback, after being a backup quarterback for four years. His debut passer rating of 33.2 was the worst for a Wisconsin quarterback since 1977 when Mike Kalasmicki's debut passer rating was 5.20. Rafael Gaglianone had his fourth game-winning field goal of his career, the most in school history.

The game was described as a "historic upset" for the Badgers by ESPN and Yahoo! Sports. After the game ESPN Staff Writer Jesse Temple stated that "Wisconsin secured its most significant nonconference regular-season victory since 1974, when the team upset fourth-ranked Nebraska 21–20 at Camp Randall Stadium." The Badgers snapped the Tigers 52-game win streak for non-conference regular season wins, an FBS record that stood since a 2002 loss to Virginia Tech.

Following the game Wisconsin's kicker Rafael Gaglianone was lauded with multiple 'Player of the Week' awards, including Big Ten special teams player of the week, Rose Bowl Big Ten player of the week and one of three Lou Groza Award Stars of the Week. Wisconsin's Jack Cichy was named the Lott IMPACT Player of the Week for his defensive efforts. Wisconsin coach Paul Chryst was announced as the "Dodd Trophy Coach of the Week" following the opening week of college football. Paul Chryst announced in a press conference that Chris Orr, who went down the first play of the game with a right leg injury, would be out for the rest of the year due to a torn ACL. He also stated that former linebacker-turned-fullback Leon Jacobs would now play both sides of the ball at fullback in addition to inside linebacker, to regain some depth at the position due to Chris Orr's season-ending injury.

Akron 

Statistical Leaders
 Rushing: Corey Clement – 21 carries, 111 yards (long 27), 5.3 yards/carry, 2 touchdowns
 Passing: Bart Houston – 15 completions, 22 passing attempts, 231 yards, 10.5 avg, 2 touchdowns
 Receiving: Jazz Peavy – 7 receptions, 100 yards, 14.3 avg, 34 long, 2 touchdowns
 Defense: T.J. Watt – 3 Tackles (3 solo), 1 Tackle-for-loss for 11 yds, 1 Sack

Georgia State 

The Badgers played against opponent Georgia State for the first time. The entire game was marked by offensive struggles on Wisconsin's part. Wisconsin jumped out to an early 6–0 lead on the foot of kicker Rafael Gaglianone, who converted field goal attempts from 47 and 28 yards in the 1st quarter. In the second half, things got ugly for the Badgers as Georgia State countered a touchdown run by Dare Ogunbowale with a field goal and touchdown of their own. With Wisconsin struggling to make progress on offense, Paul Chryst replaced QB Bart Houston with redshirt freshman Alex Hornibrook. In the 4th quarter, the winless Panthers took the lead 17–10 on a 9-yard run. Hornibrook, however, led the offense on two scoring drives - a touchdown pass to Kyle Penniston and another Gaglianone kick - to pull out the win. The Badgers improved to 3–0 on the season, but their struggles on offense led to questions about which quarterback would start next week's crucial Big Ten matchup against Michigan State.

Statistical Leaders
 Rushing: Dare Ogunbowale – 20 carries, 65 yards (long 19), 3.3 yards/carry, 1 touchdown
 Passing: Alex Hornibrook – 8 completions, 12 passing attempts, 122 yards, 10.2 avg, 1 touchdown, 1 interception
 Receiving: Jazz Peavy – 3 receptions, 67 yards, 22.3 avg, 29 long
 Defense: T.J. Edwards – 11 Tackles (6 solo), 1 Tackle-for-loss for 2 yds

at No. 8 Michigan State 

Prior to the game, it was leaked that redshirt freshman quarterback Alex Hornibrook would make his debut and start against Michigan State after his performance the prior week against Georgia State. Wisconsin was also laden with injuries going into the game with two offensive line starters, Jon Dietzen and Micah Kapoi, out with injuries along with placekicker Rafael Gaglianone and fourth-string running back Bradrick Shaw.

Michigan State opened the scoring with a field goal by Michael Geiger in the first quarter on a drive started when MSU defensive lineman Raequan Williams stripped and recovered a fumble from Wisconsin's freshman quarterback. Wisconsin answered back with a seven-and-a-half minute drive resulting in a one-yard touchdown catch by tight end Eric Steffes. Thereafter, Wisconsin's defense shut down the Spartan offense and an interception by Sojourn Shelton in the second quarter resulted in a one-yard rushing touchdown by running back Corey Clement. The Spartans made another field goal to close out the first half. In the third quarter, Badgers defensive back D'Cota Dixon forced a fumble which was recovered by fellow Badgers DB Leo Musso who returned it for a 66-yard touchdown. Also in the third quarter, the Badgers replacement kicker Andrew Endicott made his first ever field goal attempt (college or high school) at 41 yards, Corey Clement had another five-yard rushing touchdown to round out the third quarter. Overall, the Badgers forced four turnovers. Hornibrook, on third down, completed nine of his 13 attempts for 136 yards and a touchdown and, on third and long (10+ yards), he was six for six for 100 yards.

It was the first time since 1999 that a Big Ten team beat two top ten teams by the first of October  in the same season, the last being Penn State in 1999. The last time Wisconsin defeated two top ten teams in the same season was 1962. The last time Wisconsin beat MSU in East Lansing was in 2002 when Barry Alvarez was head coach. The last time Wisconsin beat a top ten team on the road was at No. 5 Purdue in 2004.

Wisconsin players were lauded after the game, including freshman QB Alex Hornibrook for making his debut on the road against No. 8 Michigan State and was named Big Ten Freshman of the Week. Outside Linebacker TJ Watt was named the Walter Camp Player of the Week and Big Ten Defensive Player of the Week for his dominant defensive performance, including 6 tackles, 3.5 tackles-for-loss, 2.5 sacks, one pass breakup and two QB hits.

Statistical Leaders
 Rushing: Corey Clement – 23 carries, 54 yards (long 22), 2.3 yards/carry, 2 touchdowns
 Passing: Alex Hornibrook – 16 completions, 26 passing attempts, 195 yards, 7.5 avg, 1 touchdown, 1 interception
 Receiving: Jazz Peavy – 4 receptions, 96 yards, 24 avg, 31 long
 Defense: T.J. Watt – 6 Tackles (3 solo), 3.5 Tackle-for-loss for 12 yds, 2.5 sacks for 10 yds, 1 Pass breakup, 2 QB hits

at No. 4 Michigan 

    
    

Statistical Leaders
 Rushing: Corey Clement – 17 carries, 68 yards (long 19), 4.0 yards/carry
 Passing: Alex Hornibrook – 9 completions, 25 passing attempts, 88 yards, 3.5 avg, 1 touchdown, 3 interceptions
 Receiving: Dare Ogunbowale – 3 receptions, 23 yards, 7.7 avg, 17 long
 Defense: Jack Cichy – 12 Tackles (10 solo), 0.5 Tackle-for-loss for 1 yd, 0.5 sack for 1 yd

No. 2 Ohio State 

    
    
    
    
    
    
    
    
    
    

Statistical Leaders
 Rushing: Corey Clement – 25 carries, 164 yards (long 68), 6.6 yards/carry
 Passing: Alex Hornibrook – 16 completions, 28 passing attempts, 214 yards, 7.6 avg, 1 touchdown, 1 interception
 Receiving: Troy Fumagalli – 7 receptions, 84 yards, 12.0 avg, 30 long
 Defense: Jack Cichy – 15 Tackles (11 solo), 3.5 Tackle-for-loss for 7 yds, 1.0 sack for 2 yds

at Iowa 

    
    
    
    
    

Statistical Leaders
 Rushing: Corey Clement – 35 carries, 134 yards (long 34), 3.8 yards/carry
 Passing: Alex Hornibrook – 11 completions, 19 passing attempts, 197 yards, 10.4 avg
 Receiving: Troy Fumagalli – 2 receptions, 38 yards, 19.0 avg, 21 long, 1 touchdown
 Defense: Jack Cichy – 10 Tackles (6 solo), 1 QB hurry

No. 7 Nebraska 

    
    
    
    
    
    

Statistical Leaders
 Rushing: Dare Ogunbowale – 11 carries, 120 yards (long 39), 10.9 yards/carry, 1 touchdown
 Passing: Alex Hornibrook – 10 completions, 16 passing attempts, 71 yards, 4.4 avg, 1 touchdown, 1 interception
 Receiving: Rob Wheelwright – 5 receptions, 43 yards, 8.6 avg, 16 long, 1 touchdown
 Defense: Ryan Connelly – 11 Tackles (7 solo), 2.0 Tackle-for-loss for 2 yds

at Northwestern 

    
    
    
    

Statistical Leaders
 Rushing: Corey Clement – 32 carries, 106 yards (long 15), 3.3 yards/carry, 1 touchdown
 Passing: Alex Hornibrook – 11 completions, 19 passing attempts, 92 yards, 4.8 avg
 Receiving: Jazz Peavy – 4 receptions, 73 yards, 18.3 avg, 32 long
 Defense: Leo Musso – 9 Tackles (9 solo), 1.0 Tackle-for-loss for 1 yd

Illinois 

    
    
    
    
    
    
    
    

Statistical Leaders
 Rushing: Corey Clement – 25 carries, 123 yards (long 23), 4.9 yards/carry, 3 touchdowns
 Passing: Alex Hornibrook – 7 completions, 12 passing attempts, 85 yards, 7.1 avg, 1 touchdown
 Receiving: Jazz Peavy – 3 receptions, 29 yards, 9.7 avg, 17 long, 1 touchdown
 Defense: Ryan Connelly – 6 Tackles (2 solo), 1.5 Tackle-for-loss for 4 yds, 1 interception returned 12 yds

at Purdue 

    
    
    
    
    
    
    
    
    
    

Statistical Leaders
 Rushing: Corey Clement – 27 carries, 112 yards (long 13), 4.1 yards/carry, 1 touchdowns
 Passing: Bart Houston – 5 completions, 6 passing attempts, 102 yards, 17.0 avg, 1 touchdown
 Receiving: Dare Ogunbowale – 3 receptions, 62 yards, 20.7 avg, 34 long
 Defense: T.J. Watt – 2 Tackles (1 solo), 1.0 Tackle-for-loss for 3 yds, 1.0 sack for loss 3 yds, 1 interception returned 17 yds for TD

Minnesota 

Statistical Leaders
 Rushing: Corey Clement - 26 carries, 100 yards (long 15), 3.8 yards/carry, 2 touchdowns
 Passing: Bart Houston - 9 completions, 14 passing attempts,  8.8 avg, 123 yards
 Receiving: Jazz Peavy- 4 receptions, 47 yards, 11.8 avg, 14 long
 Defense: Sojourn Shelton- 1 tackle, 2 interceptions returned for a combined 40 yards

Coaching staff

Roster
The Badgers returned 13 starters, six on offense, six on defense and one on special teams.

Departures
In early August, after not making the 105-man fall roster, wide receiver Krenwick Sanders announced his intent to transfer from UW due to being buried on the depth chart, he had one catch for 10 yards his true freshman year in 2014 and he redshirted the 2015 season. He was granted a release by the university and announced that he would transfer to Jacksonville State, an FCS team in Alabama.

Later in August the Badgers' 3-year starter at center, fifth-year senior Dan Voltz, retired from football due to numerous injuries sustained over his career. In the 2015 season he tore his ACL against Illinois and was out for the remainder of the season. He suffered from various ankle issues during the 2014 season.

Big Ten Players of the Week

Awards

2017 NFL Draft

2017 NFL Draft class

Signed undrafted free agents
 Corey Clement, RB, Philadelphia Eagles
 Dare Ogunbowale, RB, Houston Texans
 Sojourn Shelton, CB, Arizona Cardinals
 Robert Wheelwright, WR, New York Giants

References

Wisconsin
Wisconsin Badgers football seasons
Cotton Bowl Classic champion seasons
Wisconsin Badgers football